James Andrew Dean (15 May 1985 – May 2021) was an English footballer who played as a forward for various clubs including Bury, Stalybridge Celtic, Chorley and Bamber Bridge.

Career
Dean began his career with Great Harwood Town, making his debut for the club on 8 April 2003, alongside future Premier League player Matt Derbyshire, in a 2–0 win against Daisy Hill. In the summer of 2006, Dean signed for Clitheroe. Dean left Clitheroe in January 2007, signing for Northwich Victoria for a "four-figure fee".

In the summer of 2007, Dean signed for Bury. During his time at the club, Dean made four Football League appearances. In February 2008, following loan spells at Altrincham and Stalybridge Celtic, Dean terminated his contract with Bury via mutual consent. Following his release from Bury, Dean rejoined Stalybridge Celtic until the end of the 2007–08 season.

Following his time at Stalybridge, Dean signed for Hyde United, before moving to Harrogate Town. In 2009, Dean joined FC Halifax Town, playing for the club for three years, before signing for AFC Fylde in 2012. In 2013, Dean joined Chorley, helping the club to promotion to the Conference North in his first season at the club. In March 2016, Dean joined Ashton United on loan from Chorley. In total, he made 130 appearances for Chorley, scoring 60 goals. Following his time at Chorley, Dean signed for Warrington Town in May 2016. Dean's time at Warrington was short lived, with Dean joining Padiham on 1 September 2016. In May 2017, Dean signed for Trafford, before returning to Padiham in June 2018. Dean joined Buxton in November 2018, making his debut in a 5-0 home defeat to Witton Albion  Dean played for Buxton for the remainder of the season  On 29 October 2019, Bamber Bridge announced the signing of Dean.

Personal life and death
During his early non-League career, Dean was an English champion kickboxer.

On 6 May 2021, Dean was reported missing, with Lancashire Constabulary issuing an appeal for his whereabouts. He was last seen on 5 May in Oswaldtwistle near Blackburn. His body was found by Lancashire Police on 9 May, and his death was announced the next day. He was 35. The police announced his death was not being treated as suspicious. Warrington Town chairman Toby Macormac set up a crowdfunding campaign to provide support for Dean's family. The campaign reached over £12,000.

See also
List of solved missing person cases
List of unsolved deaths

References

1985 births
2021 deaths
AFC Fylde players
Altrincham F.C. players
Ashton United F.C. players
Association football forwards
Bamber Bridge F.C. players
Bury F.C. players
Chorley F.C. players
Clitheroe F.C. players
English footballers
English Football League players
English male kickboxers
FC Halifax Town players
Formerly missing people
Great Harwood Town F.C. players
Harrogate Town A.F.C. players
Hyde United F.C. players
National League (English football) players
Northwich Victoria F.C. players
Padiham F.C. players
Footballers from Blackburn
Stalybridge Celtic F.C. players
Trafford F.C. players
Unsolved deaths in the United Kingdom
Warrington Town F.C. players
Missing person cases in England